The Harpoon is an all-weather, over-the-horizon, anti-ship missile 
manufactured by McDonnell Douglas (now Boeing Defense, Space & Security). The AGM-84E Standoff Land Attack Missile (SLAM) and later AGM-84H/K SLAM-ER (Standoff Land Attack Missile – Expanded Response) are cruise missile variants.

The regular Harpoon uses active radar homing and flies just above the water to evade defenses. The missile can be launched from:
 Fixed-wing aircraft (the AGM-84, without the solid-fuel rocket booster)
 Surface ships (the RGM-84, fitted with a solid-fuel rocket booster that detaches when expended, to allow the missile's main turbojet to maintain flight)
 Submarines (the UGM-84, fitted with a solid-fuel rocket booster and encapsulated in a container to enable submerged launch through a torpedo tube);
 Coastal defense batteries, from which it would be fired with a solid-fuel rocket booster.

Development

In 1965, the United States Navy began studies for a missile in the  range class for use against surfaced submarines. The name Harpoon was assigned to the project. The sinking of the Israeli destroyer  in 1967 by a Soviet-built Styx anti-ship missile shocked senior United States Navy officers, who until then had not been appreciative of the threat posed by anti-ship missiles.

The first Harpoon was delivered in 1977; in 2004, Boeing delivered the 7,000th.

The Harpoon has also been adapted for carriage on several aircraft, including the P-3 Orion, the P-8 Poseidon, the AV-8B Harrier II, the F/A-18 Hornet and the U.S. Air Force B-52H bombers. The Harpoon was purchased by many nations, including India, Japan, Singapore, South Korea, Taiwan, the United Arab Emirates and most NATO countries.

The Royal Australian Air Force can fire AGM-84-series missiles from its F/A-18F Super Hornets. AP-3C Orion, and P-8 Poseidon aircraft, and previously from the now retired F-111C/Gs and F/A-18A/B Hornets. The Royal Australian Navy deploys the Harpoon on major surface combatants and in the s. The Spanish Air Force and the Chilean Navy are also AGM-84D customers, and they deploy the missiles on surface ships, and F/A-18s, F-16s, and P-3 Orion aircraft. The British Royal Navy deploys the Harpoon on several types of surface ships.

The Royal Canadian Navy carries Harpoon Block II missiles on its s. The Royal New Zealand Air Force is looking at adding the capability of carrying a stand-off missile, probably Harpoon or AGM-65 Maverick, on its six P-3 Orion patrol planes once they have all been upgraded to P3K2 standard.

The Republic of Singapore Air Force also operates five modified Fokker 50 Maritime Patrol Aircraft (MPA) which are fitted with the sensors needed to fire the Harpoon missile. The Pakistani Navy carries the Harpoon missile on its frigates and P-3C Orions. The Turkish Navy carries Harpoons on surface warships and Type 209 submarines. The Turkish Air Force will be armed with the SLAM-ER. Turkey is planning to replace the Harpoons with Turkish made Atmaca missiles.

At least 339 Harpoon missiles were sold to the Republic of China Air Force (Taiwan) for its F-16 A/B Block 20 fleet and the Republic of China Navy, which operates four guided-missile destroyers and eight guided-missile frigates with the capability of carrying the Harpoon, including the eight former U.S. Navy s and the four former USN s which have been sold to Taiwan. The two /Hai Lung submarines and 12 P-3C Orion aircraft can also use the missile. The eight s, despite being based on the US , have Harpoon capabilities deleted from their combat systems, and funding to restore it has so far been denied, the Republic of China Navy (Taiwan) decided to switch to the Hsiung Feng II and Hsiung Feng III.

The Block 1 missiles were designated AGM/RGM/UGM-84A in US service and UGM-84B in the UK. Block 1B standard missiles were designated AGM/RGM/UGM-84C, Block 1C missiles were designated AGM/RGM/UGM-84D. Block 1C used a terminal attack mode that included a pop-up to approximately  before diving on the target; Block 1B omitted the terminal pop-up; and Block 1C provided a selectable terminal attack mode.

Harpoon Block 1D
This version featured a larger fuel tank and re-attack  capability, but was not produced in large numbers because its intended mission (warfare with the Warsaw Pact countries of Eastern Europe) was considered to be unlikely following the Dissolution of the Soviet Union. Block 1D missiles were designated RGM/AGM-84F.

SLAM ATA (Block 1G)
This version, under development, gives the SLAM a re-attack capability, as well as an image comparison capability similar to the Tomahawk cruise missile; that is, the weapon can compare the target scene in front of it with an image stored in its onboard computer during terminal phase target acquisition and lock on (this is known as DSMAC). Block 1G missiles AGM/RGM/UGM-84G; the original SLAM-ER missiles were designated AGM-84H (2000-2002) and later ones the AGM-84K (2002 onwards).

Harpoon Block 1J
Block 1J was a proposal for a further upgrade, AGM/RGM/UGM-84J Harpoon (or Harpoon 2000), for use against both ship and land targets.

Harpoon Block II

In production at Boeing facilities in Saint Charles, Missouri, is the Harpoon Block II, intended to offer an expanded engagement envelope, enhanced resistance to electronic countermeasures and improved targeting. Specifically, the Harpoon was initially designed as an open-ocean weapon. The Block II missiles continue progress begun with Block IE, and the Block II missile provides the Harpoon with a littoral-water anti-ship capability.

The key improvements of the Harpoon Block II are obtained by incorporating the inertial measurement unit from the Joint Direct Attack Munition program, and the software, computer, Global Positioning System (GPS)/inertial navigation system and GPS antenna/receiver from the SLAM Expanded Response (SLAM-ER), an upgrade to the SLAM.

The US Navy awarded a $120 million contract to Boeing in July 2011 for the production of about 60 Block II Harpoon missiles, including missiles for 6 foreign militaries. 

India acquired 24 Harpoon Block II missiles to arm its maritime strike Jaguar fighters in a deal worth $170 million through the Foreign Military Sales system. In December 2010, the Defense Security Cooperation Agency (DSCA) notified U.S. Congress of a possible sale of 21 additional AGM-84L Harpoon Block II Missiles and associated equipment, parts and logistical support for a complete package worth approximately $200 million; the Indian government intends to use these missiles on its Indian Navy P-8I Neptune maritime patrol aircraft. The Indian Navy is also planning to upgrade the fleet of four submarines –  – with tube-launched Harpoon missiles.

Harpoon Block II missiles are designated AGM/RGM/UGM-84L.

In early 2018, the U.S. State Department approved the sale of Harpoon Block II to the Mexican Navy for use on their future Sigma-class design frigates, the first of which is being built by Damen Schelde Naval Shipbuilding.

Harpoon Block II+
On 18 November 2015, the U.S. Navy tested the AGM-84N Harpoon Block II+ missile against a moving ship target. The Block II+ incorporates an improved GPS guidance kit and a net-enabled data-link that allows the missile to receive in-flight targeting updates. The Block II+ is planned to enter service in 2017.

The USN intends to deploy the Harpoon Block II+ in late FY2018 by upgrading its existing inventory of Harpoon IC missiles.

Harpoon Block III
Harpoon Block III was intended to be an upgrade package to the existing USN Block 1C missiles and Command Launch Systems (CLS) for guided missile cruisers, guided missile destroyers, and the F/A-18E/F Super Hornet fighter aircraft. After experiencing an increase in the scope of required government ship integration, test and evaluation, and a delay in development of a data-link, the Harpoon Block III program was canceled by the U.S. Navy in April 2009.

Harpoon Block II+ ER
In April 2015, Boeing unveiled a modified version of the RGM-84 it called the Harpoon Next Generation. Boeing offered the missile as the U.S. Navy's Littoral Combat Ship frigate upgrade over-the-horizon anti-ship missile as a cost-effective missile upgrade option; complete Next Gen Harpoons would cost approximately as much as a Block II at $1.2 million each, with upgrades for an existing missile costing half that. The version is also called the Harpoon Block II+ ER. Boeing claims the Block II+ ER is superior to the Naval Strike Missile through its improved turbojet giving it greater range and active radar-homing seeker for all-weather operation, as well as a lighter but "more lethal" warhead. Test shots in 2017 had been confirmed. In May 2017, Boeing revealed it was no longer offering the upgraded Harpoon for the frigate OTH missile requirement, but would continue development of it.

Operational history

In 1981 and 1982, there were two accidental launches of Harpoon missiles: one by the United States Navy which caused no damage and the other by the Danish Navy, which destroyed and damaged buildings in the recreational housing area Lumsås. The Danish missile was later known as the hovsa-missile (hovsa being the Danish term for oops).

In November 1980, during Operation Morvarid, Iranian missile boats attacked and sank two Iraqi s; one of the weapons used was the Harpoon missile.

In 1986, the United States Navy sank at least two Libyan patrol boats in the Gulf of Sidra. Two Harpoon missiles were launched from the cruiser  with no confirmed results and several others from A-6 Intruder aircraft that were said to have hit their targets. Initial reports claimed that USS Yorktown scored hits on a patrol boat, but action reports indicated that the target may have been a false one and that no ships were hit by those missiles.

In 1988, Harpoon missiles were used by the U.S. to sink the Iranian frigate Sahand during Operation Praying Mantis. Another was fired at the Iranian Kaman-class missile boat Joshan, but failed to strike because the fast attack craft had already been mostly sunk by RIM-66 Standard missiles. An Iranian-owned Harpoon missile was also fired at the guided missile cruiser . The missile was successfully lured away by chaff.

A Notice to Mariners had been issued warning of the danger, but Jagvivek left port before receiving the communication and subsequently strayed into the test range area, and the Harpoon missile, loaded just with an inert dummy warhead, locked onto it instead of its intended target.

The UGM-84A undersea-launched Harpoon version was retired from U.S. Navy service in 1997, leaving the U.S. submarine force without an anti-ship missile, a capability that is not planned to be reintroduced until the Block IV Tomahawk is modified with a moving target maritime attack feature in 2021. During RIMPAC 2018 a UGM-84 Harpoon was fired by USS Olympia at the ex-USS Racine. The U.S. Navy plans to refurbish and recertify UGM-84 Harpoon missiles to reintroduce the capability to s. A $10 million contract was awarded to Boeing in January 2021 to deliver the missiles by the end of the year.

In June 2009, it was reported by an American newspaper, citing unnamed officials from the Obama administration and the U.S. Congress, that the American government had accused Pakistan of illegally modifying some older Harpoon missiles to strike land targets. Pakistani officials denied this and they claimed that the US was referring to a new Pakistani-designed missile. Some international experts were also reported to be skeptical of the accusations. Robert Hewson, editor of Jane's Air Launched Weapons, pointed out that the Harpoon is not suitable for the land-attack role due to deficiency in range. He also stated that Pakistan was already armed with more sophisticated missiles of Pakistani or Chinese design and, therefore, "beyond the need to reverse-engineer old US kit." Hewson offered that the missile tested by Pakistan was part of an undertaking to develop conventionally armed missiles, capable of being air- or surface-launched, to counter its rival India's missile arsenal. It was later stated that Pakistan and the US administration had reached some sort of agreement allowing US officials to inspect Pakistan's inventory of Harpoon missiles, and the issue had been resolved.

The Harpoon missile has also emerged as a preferred choice for several foreign countries under the Foreign Military Sales (FMS) route. In 2020 its manufacturer Boeing won two major contracts for supplying Harpoon missiles to Saudi Arabia and six other partner nations under a $3.1 billion deal.

India will also receive Harpoon missiles under FMS in a $155 million deal.

In late May 2022, Denmark sent Harpoon launchers and missiles to Ukraine to help their war effort, and shortly after, the Netherlands sent additional missiles. In mid-June 2022, the US announced that they would supply Ukraine with Harpoon launchers and missiles, and the UK Defence Secretary said that they also were looking into supplying Ukraine with the missiles. On 17 June, Ukraine claimed to have sunk the tugboat  with two Harpoon missiles. In a tweet they said "Spasatel Vasily Bekh, a tug of the Russian Black Sea Fleet, successfully demilitarized by the @UA_NAVY. The ship was transporting personnel, weapons and ammunition to the occupied Snake Island." Ukraine's Naval Command said the Russian tugboat had a Tor missile system on board.

General characteristics

 Primary function: Air-, surface-, or submarine-launched anti-surface (anti-ship) missile
 Contractor: The McDonnell Douglas Astronautic Company – East
 Power plant: Teledyne CAE J402 turbojet, -force (2.9 kN) thrust, and a solid-propellant booster for surface and submarine launches
 Length:
 Air-launched: 
 Surface and submarine-launched: 
 Weight:
 Air-launched: 
 Submarine or ship launched from box or canister launcher: 
 Diameter: 
 Wing span: 
 Maximum altitude:  with booster fins and wings
 Range: Over-the-horizon (approx 50 nautical miles)
 AGM-84D (Block 1C): 220 km (120 nmi)
 RGM/UGM-84D (Block 1C): 140 km (75 nmi)
 AGM-84E (Block 1E): 93 km (50 nmi)
 AGM-84F (Block 1D): 315 km (170 nmi)
 RGM-84F (Block 1D): 278 km (150 nmi)
 RGM/AGM-84L (Block 2): Over 
 AGM-84H/K (Block 1G / Block 1J): 280 km (150 nmi)
 Speed: High subsonic, around 850 km/h (460 knots, 240 m/s, or 530 mph)
 Guidance: Sea-skimming cruise monitored by radar altimeter, active radar terminal homing
 Warhead: , penetration high-explosive blast
 Unit cost: US$1,527,416
 Date deployed:
 Ship-launched (RGM-84A): 1977
 Air-launched (AGM-84A): 1979
 Submarine-launched (UGM-84A): 1981
 SLAM (AGM-84E): 1990
 SLAM-ER (AGM-84H): 1998 (delivery); 2000 (initial operational capability; IOC)
 SLAM-ER ATA (AGM-84K): 2002 (IOC)

Operators

 Royal Australian Navy
 Royal Australian Air Force

 Belgian Navy

 Brazilian Air Force

 Royal Canadian Air Force
 Royal Canadian Navy

 Chilean Navy
 Chilean Air Force

 Royal Danish Navy

 Egyptian Air Force
 Egyptian Navy

 German Navy

 Hellenic Air Force
 Hellenic Navy

 Indian Air Force
 Indian Navy

 Indonesian Navy (Block 1D) (retired)

 Islamic Republic of Iran Navy

 Israeli Air Force
 Israeli Navy

 Japan Maritime Self Defense Force

 Royal Malaysian Air Force

 Mexican Navy

 Royal Moroccan Air Force

 Royal Netherlands Navy

 Pakistan Navy

 Polish Navy

 Portuguese Air Force
 Portuguese Navy

 Qatar Air Force - Harpoon Block 2 on order for use with F-15QA

 Republic of Korea Air Force
 Republic of Korea Navy

 Royal Saudi Air Force
 Royal Saudi Navy

 Republic of Singapore Air Force
 Republic of Singapore Navy

 Spanish Air Force
 Spanish Navy
 (Taiwan)
 Republic of China Air Force
 Republic of China Navy

 Royal Thai Navy

 Turkish Air Force
 Turkish Navy

 Royal Navy
 Royal Air Force
 
 Ukrainian Navy 

 United States Air Force
 United States Navy
 United States Coast Guard (retired)

See also 

 AGM-158C LRASM
 Atmaca
 Exocet
 HAS-250
 Hsiung Feng II
 Hsiung Feng III
 Kh-35
 Naval Strike Missile
 Naval anti ship missile -MR
 NASM-SR
 Neptune
 Otomat
 RBS-15
 Sea Eagle
 Sea Breaker
 SSM-700K Haeseong
 Type 80 Air-to-Ship Missile
 Type 88 Surface-to-Ship Missile
 Type 90 Ship-to-Ship Missile
 Type 93 Air-to-Ship Missile
 YJ-83

References

External links

 US Navy Fact File: HarpoonOfficial website
 Harpoon informationBoeing website
 Detailed information of all Harpoon versions and upgradesFrom Encyclopedia Astronautica
 AGM-84 variants
 McDonnell-Douglas AGM-84A Harpoon and AGM-84E SLAM
 FAS Harpoon article
 Global Security Harpoon article
 Boeing Harpoon Block III Press Release
 Boeing Harpoon Block II Backgrounder
 Royal Netherlands Navy launches Harpoons from new frigate HMS De Ruyter (Defense-Aerospace) 
 

Anti-ship cruise missiles
Naval cruise missiles
Surface-to-surface missiles of the United States
Cold War anti-ship missiles of the United States
Anti-ship missiles of the United States
Air-to-surface missiles of the United States
Military equipment introduced in the 1970s
Fire-and-forget weapons